The root cap is a type of tissue at the tip of a plant root. It is also called calyptra. Root caps contain statocytes which are involved in gravity perception in plants. If the cap is carefully removed the root will grow randomly. The root cap protects the growing tip in plants. It secretes mucilage to ease the movement of the root through soil, and may also be involved in communication with the soil microbiota.

The purpose of the root cap is to enable downward growth of the root, with the root cap covering the sensitive tissue in the root. Also, the root cap enables geoperception or gravitropism. This allows the plant to grow downwards (with gravity) or upwards (against gravity).

The root cap is absent in some parasitic plants and some aquatic plants, in which a sac-like structure called the root pocket may form instead.

References

Plant anatomy